are stagecraft tricks used in Japanese kabuki theater, making use of trapdoors, revolving stages, and other equipment.

Often translated as "playing to the gallery," many drama enthusiasts consider these sorts of adaptations to be demeaning to the art of kabuki. According to one scholar, Ichikawa Ennosuke, "Rapid 'trick' appearances and disappearances of the actor are relatively few and are held in low esteem by the Kabuki connoisseur, who refers to them as keren (playing to the gallery)".

Primary forms of

References

Kabuki
Stagecraft
Japanese words and phrases